Fabian Broghammer (born 14 January 1990) is a German footballer.

Club career

Bristol Rovers
In July 2012, he joined English Football League Two side Bristol Rovers on trial on the recommendation of then VfL Wolfsburg manager Felix Magath, a former Hamburg teammate of Rovers' manager at the time Mark McGhee. On 12 August, it was announced that Broghammer had signed a one-year deal with Rovers, with the option of a second year.

He made his debut for Rovers on the 18 August 2012, against Oxford United coming on as a 50th-minute substitute for midfielder Wayne Brown in Bristol Rovers' first league game of the season. On 8 September 2012, injury time was approaching when he scored his first goal for Bristol Rovers, in the 2-2 home draw against Aldershot. The assist for his goal was from Elliot Richards.

Broghammer took up the option to extend his contract by a further year at Rovers but suffered an anterior cruciate ligament rupture in a pre-season friendly with Hereford United. The injury kept Broghammer out for nine months, returning in the away fixture with Portsmouth. Rovers were relegated at the end of the season and Broghammer was released, having made 40 appearances for the club over two seasons.

SV Wiesbaden
Broghammer joined SV Wiesbaden on 1 August 2014.

International career
Broghammer represented Germany at under 17, 18, and 19 level, amassing 17 caps overall. 

Broghammer was part of the German squad that finished third at the 2007 FIFA U-17 World Cup.

References

External links

 

1990 births
Living people
People from Bergstraße (district)
Sportspeople from Darmstadt (region)
German footballers
Germany youth international footballers
TSG 1899 Hoffenheim II players
VfB Stuttgart II players
SV Darmstadt 98 players
Bristol Rovers F.C. players
English Football League players
3. Liga players
Association football midfielders
Footballers from Hesse
21st-century German people